Personal numbering is the name for the virtual telephone number service in the UK. Typically the national destination code used for this service is (0)70. The service provides a flexible virtual telephone number able to be routed to any other number, including international mobiles. For example, the UK number +44 70 0585 0070 might route to an Inmarsat satellite phone number, allowing the user to have a UK number while roaming globally.

This service has however been reported as having "significant scamming activity" of various sorts as users can mistakenly assume they are calling a UK mobile telephone number that generally costs far less.

(For the telephone numbering plan context of 070 numbers see Telephone numbers in the United Kingdom).

History 
In the United States, AT&T ran a trial in 1991 which led, in 1992, to the AT&T EasyReach 700 service of follow me numbers, on area code 700.

Early days 
After protracted lobbying of Oftel throughout 1992, FleXtel launched the UK's first Personal Telephone Number Service, using the 09567 number range in December 1993,

070 introduction 
In 1995 the UK telecoms regulator, Oftel (now Ofcom), reserved the whole of the 070 range exclusively for personal numbering, imitating the USA area code 700. FleXtel migrated its existing customers across during a two-year transition phase.

Fraudulent use

Call cost scams 
A range of scams revolve around UK residents being tricked into making calls to 070 numbers that attract much larger than normal call costs.

False UK number scams
In its full format (e.g. +44 70 0585 0070) an 070 number will be internationally recognisable as a UK number - even though it might in fact terminate to a mobile number anywhere - this feature is used in a variety of scams.

Ofcom reforms 
Concerned at the number of scams, Ofcom consulted on removing revenue share from the 070 range and this took effect in 2009. They had previously considered other options such as moving this service to the unused 06 number range or enforcing a pre-call announcement of the call charges. Although consulted on, those other remedies were never put into effect.

Concerned at the lack of transparency and the high retail charges for calls to 070 numbers, Ofcom launched a call cost review in 2017. This led to a consultation in 2018 which recommended capping the termination rate or wholesale rate at no more than the rate for calling a mobile number. Those changes took effect on 1 October 2019 and several phone providers have already passed the saving on by now including calls to 070 numbers within inclusive allowances.

See also 
 Personal Numbers, similar service in Spain
 Area code 700, similar US service
 Follow-me, similar concept for PBXs
 Virtual number
 Universal Personal Telecommunications

References 

Telephone numbers